Türk Telekom Basketbol Kulübü (English: Turk Telekom Basketball Club) is a professional basketball team that is based in Ankara, Turkey. The team is currently playing in the Turkish Basketball Super League. It is a branch of the Türk Telekom GSK sports club. Their home arena is the Ankara Arena. The arena, which has a capacity of 10,400 seats, opened in April 2010.

History

The club was founded in 1954 and opened its basketball section as name of PTT in 1991. Thereafter, the team received name of Türk Telekom PTT in 1996. Recently, the team is continuing with the name of Türk Telekom.

Türk Telekom has won the Turkish Cup title after beating Oyak Renault in 2008. Also, the team won the Turkish President's Cup title after beating Fenerbahçe Ülker that year.

Türk Telekom also has a reserve team as name of Genç Telekom. They compete in the Turkish Basketball Second League.

In September 2011, first Turkish NBA All-Star player Mehmet Okur of the Utah Jazz announced he would play for Türk Telekom, due to the 2011 NBA lockout.

In 2016, Türk Telekom relegated from the BSL after finishing 15th in the regular season. In 2018, the team returned as it promoted from the Turkish First League. In its first season back, the club would also play in the EuroCup, as the club returns to Europe after 6 years.

Home arenas

 Ankara Atatürk Sport Hall (1991–2011)
 Ankara Arena (2011–present)

Players

Current roster

Depth chart

Notable players

 Alper Yılmaz
 Barış Ermiş
 Can Akın
 Cevher Özer
 Cüneyt Erden
 Erdal Bibo
 Kerem Tunçeri
 Murat Evliyaoğlu
-- Rasim Başak
 Şemsettin Baş
 Mehmet Okur
 Lukša Andrić
 Vladan Alanović
 Jan Jagla
 Heiko Schaffartzik
 Simas Jasaitis
 Luka Bogdanović
 Mirko Milićević
 Miroslav Radošević
 Sani Bečirović
 Aleksandar Ćapin
 Goran Jagodnik
 Marijan Kraljević
 Kyle Wiltjer
 Derrick Alston
 Dee Brown
 Richard Coffey
 Ricky Davis
 Sam Dekker
- Erwin Dudley
 Acie Earl
 Khalid El-Amin
 Tony Gaffney
 Jerian Grant
 Johnny O'Bryant
 Steven Rogers
 Josh Shipp
 Mitch Smith
 Greg Stiemsma
 Jared Terrell 
 K'zell Wesson
 Trevor Wilson
 Rickie Winslow
 Kennedy Winston
- Michael Wright

Honours
 Turkish Basketball Cup
 Winners (1): 2007-08
 Turkish Basketball Presidential Cup
 Winners (2): 1997, 2008

Season by season

 Cancelled due to the COVID-19 pandemic in Europe.

References

External links
Official Website 
TBLStat.net Profile 
Eurobasket.com Page

 
Türk Telekom GSK
Basketball teams in Turkey
Turkish Basketball Super League teams
1991 establishments in Turkey
Basketball teams established in 1991
Sports teams in Ankara